Carl Sommer (born October 17, 1930) is an American author, educator and entrepreneur.

Sommer is the founder of Advance Publishing Incorporated, Digital Cornerstone, and Reliable EDM. His notable works include the Sommer-Time Story series, Phonics Adventure and Number Success are all a part of the SommerLearning.com literacy program.  The Award-Winning  Another Sommer-Time Story series inspired a television series called Another Sommer-Time Adventure on the children's channel, Tri-State Christian Television and Digital television. The show  focuses on imparting values and principles of success. Sommer's company, Reliable EDM, was founded in 1986 and is the largest electrical discharge machining shop in North America.

References

American businesspeople
American educators
1930 births
Living people
American male writers